The Perth Mint is Australia's official bullion mint and wholly owned by the Government of Western Australia. Established on 20 June 1899, two years before Australia's Federation in 1901, the Perth Mint was the last of three Australian colonial branches of the United Kingdom's Royal Mint (after the now-defunct Sydney Mint and Melbourne Mint) intended to refine gold from the gold rushes and to mint gold sovereigns and half-sovereigns for the British Empire. Along with the Royal Australian Mint, which produces coins of the Australian dollar for circulation, the Perth Mint is the older of Australia's two mints issuing coins that are legal tender.

History

Perth Mint, as a business entity, was established during the 1890s, as a subsidiary of the Royal Mint in the United Kingdom.

The foundation stone of the Mint building was laid in 1896 by Sir John Forrest. The building was officially opened on 20 June 1899. At that time, the population of Western Australia (WA) was growing rapidly (23,000 in 1869 and 180,000 in 1900) due to the discovery of rich gold deposits at Coolgardie, Kalgoorlie and the Murchison region.

The Mint initially served two purposes. Firstly, it minted coins for circulation in WA – this had previously been done externally, and as a result, there had often been insufficient currency in circulation. Secondly, the Mint bought the vast majority of gold mined in WA; at the time, a large proportion of mining was done by "diggers" (prospectors and/or small-scale, independent miners), who had migrated to WA in thousands from other parts of Australia and overseas. Mining businesses were able to sell their raw gold directly to the Mint, where it was made into gold coins and bullion.

Although WA took part in the Federation of the Australian colonies in 1901, the Mint remained under the control of the UK government for 69 years. On 1 July 1970, ownership was acquired by the state government of Western Australia, as a statutory authority.

In the 32 years up to 1931, the Perth Mint struck more than 106 million gold sovereigns, and nearly 735,000 half-sovereigns (intermittently between 1900 and 1920), for use as currency in Australia and throughout the British Empire. The Mint stopped making gold sovereigns when Britain abandoned the gold standard in 1931. Nevertheless, the refinery remained busy as staff turned their skills to making fine gold bullion bars. But it was not long before the Perth Mint was involved again in the production of coins. During World War II, the Perth Mint began minting the Australian coinage from base metals. Up until the end of 1983, the Perth Mint also manufactured much of Australia's lower-denomination coin currency.

The Perth Mint achieved "arguably the purest of all gold" in 1957 when the mint produced a  proof plate of six nines999.999 parts of gold per thousand. The Royal Mint was so impressed that it ordered some of the gold as the benchmark for its own standards.

The Mint's new direction was formalised in 1987 with the creation of Gold Corporation by a State Act of Parliament. Under a unique agreement with the Commonwealth of Australia's Department of the Treasury, the Perth Mint's new operator was empowered to mint and market gold, silver and platinum Australian legal tender coinage to investors and collectors worldwide. Prime Minister Bob Hawke launched the Australian Nugget Gold Coins Series in 1987.

Up to 2000, the Perth Mint's refined gold output totalling , representing 3.25% of the total weight of gold produced by humankind. This is about the current holdings of gold bullion in the United States Bullion Depository at Fort Knox.

In 2003, the Perth Mint officially opened an  state-of-the-art manufacturing facility next door to its original limestone building.

In October 2011, the Perth Mint created the world's largest, heaviest and most valuable gold coin, breaking the record previously held by the Royal Canadian Mint. It features, on the obverse side, the effigy of Elizabeth II, and a red kangaroo on the reverse side. It is legal tender in Australia with face value A$1 million, but at the time of minting it was valued at A$53.5 million.

Today, the Perth Mint continues to provide refining and other services to the gold industry and manufactures many coin related numismatic items for investors and coin collectors. It is responsible for manufacturing and marketing most of Australia's legal tender precious metal coins, including proof quality Australian Nugget gold coins, Australian Platinum Koala coins, Australian Silver Kookaburra coins, Swan series coins and bullion.

As of November 2019, the Perth Mint refines approximately 79 percent of the Australasian market's gold production and 30 percent of silver at a separate secured facility outside the city centre. It mints coins and bars from both Australian gold and metal sourced from other countries, representing 10 percent of the global production. It sold about A$18.9 billion in pure gold, silver, and platinum bullion bars and coins in 2018.

Gold-backed digital assets

GoldPass is an app powered by InfiniGold technology which allows investors to instantly and securely buy, sell and transfer physical gold via digital certificates. Each certificate is 100% backed by physical gold held at the Perth Mint and guaranteed by the Government of Western Australia. In October 2019, precious metals digitalisation company InfiniGold announced it would issue the Perth Mint Gold Token (PMGT) on the Ethereum public blockchain. Each digital token is backed 1:1 by GoldPass certificates held by InfiniGold and maintained directly with the Perth Mint.

Trail
A collaboration known as the Gold Industry Group began a Heart of Gold Discovery Trail in Perth in October 2018. The project included the Perth Mint as a partner.

Controversy
In June 2020, an investigation by the Australian Financial Review found that Perth Mint had purchased annually from a convicted killer in Papua New Guinea. The Western Australian corruption watchdog launched an investigation. On 27 July it was reported that HSBC and JP Morgan stopped buying gold from Perth Mint, citing potential damage to their reputation.  On 10 August a London Bullion Market Association probe into the Perth Mint found no serious examples of misconduct.

Further investigation into the Perth Mint has exposed a secret recording of the Perth Mint CEO Richard Hayes and the failure to refer allegations of impropriety to the West Australian Corruption and Crime Commission in late 2017. This has resulted in the corruption watchdog launching an investigation into the Perth Mint.

Operation Atlantis
International enforcement sources confirmed in October 2020 that Euro Pacific Bank was the target of Operation Atlantis, an international tax probe by the Joint Chiefs of Global Tax Enforcement (“J5”), a task force made up of the tax offices of Australia, the United States, the United Kingdom, the Netherlands, and Canada, that was set up after the Panama Papers leak in 2016. The Perth Mint partnered with Euro Pacific to allow the bank's customers to buy gold. The Perth Mint was also reportedly probed by the Australian Tax Office in January 2020.

On 20 October 2020, the Australian Financial Review reported that the Perth Mint allowed clients of a tax haven bank, which was being investigated for its links with global organized crime syndicates, to purchase more than $100 million of gold without conducting the identity checks required to prevent money laundering. On 30 August 2022, Australia's Financial Crimes regulator, AUSTRAC, appointed an external auditor to investigate concerns about how the Perth Mint complies with its obligations under Australian Money Laundering legislation.

Tax havens
In July 2020, an article in the Australian Financial Review revealed that the Perth Mint had signed the Bank of Cyprus as a customer despite the US State Department declaring Cyprus a "major money laundering jurisdiction" and warning about its links to Russian organised crime. It also granted approved dealer status to Euro Pacific Bank, from the British Virgin Islands, and Swiss private bank, BFI Consulting. All three institutions provide offshore banking services to clients who may be seeking to avoid tax or disguise the true ownership of their assets.

Data breach
In September 2018 the Perth Mint defended its decision not to make disclosure announcements to the ASX and New York Stock Exchange on the grounds the breach did not relate to its ASX-listed PMGold or NYSE listed AAAU investment products.

Child labour
In June 2020 the Perth Mint said it would stop processing metal from artisanal and small-scale miners after allegations that it took gold dug in Papua New Guinea using child labour and toxic mercury.

See also

 Bullion coin
 Gold as an investment
 Hints to Prospectors and Owners of Treatment Plants
 History of Western Australia
 Inflation hedge
 Perth Mint Swindle
 Silver as an investment

References

External links

 
 Perth Mint Bullion website
 A Comprehensive Guide to the Perth Mint 1oz Bar
 State Heritage record

Mints of Australia
Museums in Perth, Western Australia
Numismatic museums in Australia
East Perth, Western Australia
Landmarks in Perth, Western Australia
Australian gold rushes
1899 establishments in Australia
George Temple-Poole buildings
Romanesque Revival architecture in Australia
Perth Mint Swindle
Bullion dealers
Mints (currency)
State Register of Heritage Places in the City of Perth